In mathematics, a varifold is, loosely speaking, a measure-theoretic generalization of the concept of a differentiable manifold, by replacing differentiability requirements with those provided by rectifiable sets, while maintaining the general algebraic structure usually seen in differential geometry.  Varifolds generalize the idea of a rectifiable current, and are studied in geometric measure theory.

Historical note
Frederick J. Almgren Jr. slightly modified the definition in his mimeographed notes  and coined the name varifold: he wanted to emphasize that these objects are substitutes for ordinary manifolds in problems of the calculus of variations. The modern approach to the theory was based on Almgren's notes and laid down by William K. Allard, in the paper .

Definition

where  is the Grassmannian of all m-dimensional linear subspaces of an n-dimensional vector space. The Grassmannian is used to allow the construction of analogs to differential forms as duals to vector fields in the approximate tangent space of the set .

The particular case of a rectifiable varifold is the data of a m-rectifiable set M (which is measurable with respect to the m-dimensional Hausdorff measure), and a density function defined on M, which is a positive function θ measurable and locally integrable with respect to the m-dimensional Hausdorff measure. It defines a Radon measure V on the Grassmannian bundle of ℝn

where

 is the −dimensional Hausdorff measure
Rectifiable varifolds are weaker objects than locally rectifiable currents: they do not have any orientation. Replacing M with more regular sets, one easily see that differentiable submanifolds are particular cases of rectifiable manifolds.

Due to the lack of orientation, there is no boundary operator defined on the space of varifolds.

See also
Current
Geometric measure theory
Grassmannian
Plateau's problem
Radon measure

Notes

References
.
.
.
.
.
. A set of mimeographed notes where Frederick J. Almgren Jr. introduces varifolds for the first time. 
. The first widely circulated book describing the concept of a varifold. In chapter 4 is a section titled "A solution to the existence portion of Plateau's problem" but the stationary varifolds used in this section can only solve a greatly simplified version of the problem. For example, the only stationary varifolds containing the unit circle have support the unit disk. In 1968 Almgren used a combination of varifolds, integral currents, flat chains and Reifenberg's methods in an attempt to extend Reifenberg's celebrated 1960 paper to elliptic integrands. However, there are serious errors in his proof. A different approach to the Reifenberg problem for elliptic integrands has been recently provided by Harrison and Pugh  without using varifolds.   
.
. The second edition of the book .
.

.
,  (Science Press),  (International Press).
.
.
.

Measure theory
Generalized manifolds